Luis Raúl Martínez Rodríguez (March 6, 1962February 2, 2014), better known as Luis Raúl, was a Puerto Rican actor, comedian and television host. He was known for his stand-up comedy and his various characters. He also hosted TeleOnce's (later Univision Puerto Rico) talk and variety show Anda Pa'l Cará from 2001 to 2003 and Telemundo Puerto Rico's game show Pa' Que Te Lo Goces in 2006. He died early in the morning of February 2, 2014 from kidney failure which in turn led to cardiac and respiratory arrest.

Early years and education
Luis Raúl was born in the city of Ponce, Puerto Rico to Raúl Martínez and Nilda Rodríguez. As a young child, he showed interest in acting. During school, he would frequently participate in plays and shows. After graduating from Dr. Pila High School, he enrolled at the University of Puerto Rico at Mayagüez to study chemical engineering. After two years, he transferred to Universidad del Sagrado Corazón and majored in business administration, taking electives in theatre. In 1980 he graduated from Ofelia D'Acosta's School of Dramatic Arts.

Career

Early career: 1981–1997
In 1981, he moved to San Juan where he held several jobs to make ends meet. Among them, he worked by selling popcorn and hot dogs in two theaters. In the meantime, he studied at the Acting Academy of Ofelia D'Acosta's acting academy and started performing at weekly shows. In 1983 he debuted in the play Los Títeres de Cachiporra. In 1985 he had his first starring role in Un Mismo Corazón (One Heart), a play that dealt with the subject of AIDS, something that was taboo at the time.

At the same time, he started appearing in several local telenovelas and other TV shows. In 1987 he joined actor Edwin Pabellón in producing the radio show Algo Mejor. He also had sporadic appearances at the show En Serio con Silverio hosted by Silverio Pérez. After that, Perez recruited him for a new show called ¿Que Es Lo Que Pasa Aquí? Ahh!, a show dedicated to political and social satire. It was this show that established Luis Raúl as a comedic figure.

In 1992, Luis Raúl retired from the program with the intention of moving to Los Angeles and seek success there. In Los Angeles, he performed at several Hispanic commercials and shows, and also participated in various stand-up comedy and improvisation shows. However, he traveled to Puerto Rico constantly to perform his stand-up comedy show successfully around the island. In 1997 he also had his own show titled Pa' la Cama con Luis Raúl produced by Luisito Vigoreaux.

TV and stage return: 2000–2012
In 2000 he officially established himself back in Puerto Rico and started another show called En Casa de Luis Raúl in Televicentro. In 2001 he was hired by Univision to replace long-time friend Silverio Pérez as host of the popular late night show Anda Pa'l Cará upon Perez's departure; he hosted the show with Gricel Mamery until 2003. In 2002 he adopted two children calling Angel and Janet.

In 2008, Luis Raúl kicked off a farewell tour called  with the intention of retiring afterward. The tour was highly successful in Puerto Rico and one of the venues where the show was taped was released as a film in theatres in the island titled . After a brief hiatus, he returned in 2009 with another tour titled . In 2010, he started a new tour called . He embarked on another stand-up comedy in 2011 called . On March 5, 2012, he had a special program called  on Telemundo, which he co-hosted with Maritza Baigés. His penultimate stand-up comedy was titled  and ran from Autumn 2012 to Spring 2013.

Final show and posthumous film: 2013–2014
His final stand-up comedy show was a one night only performance titled "Que OJOnes" at Puerto Rico's renowned José Miguel Agrelot Coliseum, where Luis Raúl became the first comedian to perform at the venue on September 14, 2013 and the first show to be broadcast live from the venue over the internet. This performance marked the final show he performed before his death.

One of Luis Raúl's final wishes as a stand-up comedian, was to use the footage recorded from "Que OJOnes" and turn it into a film. On March 23, 2014, the film plans were confirmed undergoing post-production at the time. On May 5, 2014, the posthumous film was given a theatrical release for June 5, 2014 in Puerto Rico and select theaters in the United States at a later date, marking Luis Raúl's final film.

Death
On January 13, 2014, Martínez was hospitalized after suffering bilateral pneumonia. Two weeks later, his condition worsened and he was placed on a ventilator that provided artificial respiration. However, aggravated by pre-existing conditions of diabetes and hypertension, his condition progressively worsened and his left lung was severely damaged. Consequently, he suffered from kidney failure, which in turn led to cardiac and respiratory arrest, dying early in the morning of February 2, 2014. Several of his colleagues expressed their condolences shortly after the news was made public. As per final wishes, Luis Raúl's family had his body directly cremated instead of holding a vigil. Prior to falling ill, Martínez had filmed scenes in a supporting role for the Dominican film Un lío en dólares; his character was recast after his death.

Characters
Aside from stand-up comedy, Luis Raúl also popularized six characters that he often portrayed on television and occasionally in his stand-ups:
 Piquito: a naive kid with a speech impairment who makes a living selling barbecue chicken. Though Piquito tried selling other products, he always ended up back to selling barbecue chicken, where he was happy to be at.
 Tito Párpados: an Argentinian celebrity and media reporter with a flamboyant hairdo.
 El Bebé: a loving baby during the day but a perverted rascal at night.
 Malín: Luis Raúl's nuyorican cousin who constantly claims she performs "Off-off-off-off-Broadway... almost in Queens".
 Doña Mary Jane: an elderly pot-head woman; her name is a reference to one of the slang terms for marijuana.
 Junito Puppy Love: a flirting Don Juan who spends his time calling one of his many girlfriends and expressing his love with certain puns.

Stand-up shows

Filmography

See also

List of Puerto Ricans
List of game show hosts

Notes

References

External links

1962 births
2014 deaths
Male actors from Ponce, Puerto Rico
American television talk show hosts
Deaths from pneumonia in Puerto Rico
Puerto Rican comedians
Puerto Rican male television actors
Puerto Rican television personalities
21st-century American comedians
Universidad del Sagrado Corazón alumni